Jais railway station is a railway station in Amethi district, Uttar Pradesh. Its code is JAIS. It serves Jais town. The station consists of two platforms and is being electrified the rail line. The platforms are sheltered and has facilities including chair seating, drinking water, parking, and toilet. This station is near by Rajiv Gandhi Institute of Petroleum Technology (RGIPT), a institute of national importance in Amethi district.

In a letter to Smriti Irani, Cabinet Minister and current Member of Parliament from Amethi (Lok Sabha constituency), Railway minister Shree Piyush Goyal ordered to stop Bhopal – Pratapgarh Express at Jais railway station

Trains
Some of the trains that runs from JAIS are :
 Kashi Vishwanath Express
 Bhopal–Pratapgarh Express (via Lucknow)
 Howrah–Amritsar Express
 Neelachal Express
 Padmavat Express
 Varanasi–Dehradun Express
 Prayag–Bareilly Express
 Varanasi–Lucknow Intercity Express

See also
 Gauriganj railway station
 Amethi railway station
 Rae Bareli Junction railway station
 Pratapgarh Junction railway station

References

External links 
 - JAIS/Jais

Railway stations in Amethi district
Lucknow NR railway division